Events from the year 1931 in Denmark.

Incumbents
 Monarch – Christian X
 Prime minister – Thorvald Stauning

Events

 31 August – Karen Blixen returns to Denmark after living 28 years in Kenya, settling at her native Rungstedlund.

The arts

Music
 14 August – Premiere performance of Carl Nielsen's Commotio, the composer's last major work, in Aarhus Cathedral.

Sports

Cycling
 21–30 August  The 1931 UCI Track Cycling World Championships are held in Copenhagen
 Willy Hansen wins gold in men's sprint.
 Helger Harder, Willy Gervin amd Anker Meyer-Andersen win gold, silver and bronze in men's sprint at the Amateur event.
 26 August  Henry Hansen wins gold in Amateur Road Race at the 1931 UCI Road World Championships.

Football
 Frem wins their second Danish football championship by winning the 1930–31 Danish Championship League.
 4 August  Holbæk B&I is founded.

Births
7 July – Palle Kjærulff-Schmidt, film director and screenwriter (died 2018)

Deaths
 16 January – Carl Hansen Ostenfeld, botanist (born 1873)
 18 February – Peter Elfelt, photographer (born 1866)
 15 April – Knud V. Engelhardt, industrial designer (born 1882)
 4 May – Christian Klengenberg, whaler, trapper and trader (born 1869)
 7 June – Arnold Krog, designer (born 1856)
 8 August – Einar Hein, landscape painter associated with the "Skagen Painters" (born 1875)
 3 December – Carl Nielsen, composer (born 1865)
 23 December – Asger Skovgaard Ostenfeld, engineer (born 1866)

References

 
Denmark
Years of the 20th century in Denmark
1930s in Denmark
1931 in Europe